The following is a list of Superfund sites in New Jersey designated as such under the Comprehensive Environmental Response, Compensation, and Liability Act (CERCLA).

Background
For decades, it was standard practice to dump waste on the ground, in rivers or to leave it out in the open. As a result, thousands of uncontrolled or abandoned contaminated sites were created. Some common contaminated sites include abandoned warehouses, manufacturing facilities, processing plants and landfills. In response to growing concern over health and environmental risks posed by these contaminated sites, the 96th Congress established the Superfund program in 1980 to clean up these sites.

The Superfund program is administered by the U.S. Environmental Protection Agency (EPA) in cooperation with individual states. In New Jersey, the Department of Environmental Protection's (NJDEP) Site Remediation Program oversees the Superfund program.

, there are 105 Superfund sites listed on the National Priorities List (NPL).  Thirty-six additional sites have been cleaned up and deleted from the list.

National Priorities List
Sites currently listed on the NPL:

Proposed Sites
Sites Proposed for Addition to the NPL:

Deleted Sites
Sites deleted from the NPL:

See also
Brook Industrial Park Superfund Site
List of Superfund sites in the United States
List of environmental issues
List of waste types
TOXMAP

References

External links
EPA list of proposed Superfund sites in New Jersey
EPA list of current Superfund sites in New Jersey
NJ National Priorities List
EPA list of Superfund site construction completions in New Jersey
EPA list of partially deleted Superfund sites in New Jersey
EPA list of deleted Superfund sites in New Jersey

New Jersey
 
Superfund